The 1980 West Virginia gubernatorial election took place on November 4, 1980, to elect the governor of West Virginia. Incumbent Governor Jay Rockefeller defeated former Governor Arch Moore in a rematch of the 1972 contest.

Results

Democratic primary

General election

References

1980
gubernatorial
West Virginia